Antti Kerälä (born February 3, 1987) is a Finnish professional ice hockey center who currently plays for Porin Ässät in the Finnish Liiga. He has previously played with HPK, Jokerit and KalPa. He signed a one-year contract as a free agent with Ässät on June 3, 2014.

References

External links

1987 births
Living people
Finnish ice hockey centres
HPK players
Jokerit players
Jokipojat players
KalPa players
Mikkelin Jukurit players
TuTo players
Ässät players
Nikkō Ice Bucks players
Finnish expatriate ice hockey players in Japan
People from Hattula
Sportspeople from Kanta-Häme